Musa Herdem, also known as Musa the Sniper, was an Kurdish YPG fighter who gained significant media attention during the Siege of Kobane in 2014.

Born in Rojhelat, Iran, in Selmas near Urmiye, Herdem spoke fluent Kurmanci and Sorani as well as Persian and Turkish. Growing up in Selmas, a mixed city of Armenians, Assyrians, Kurds, and Azeris, he had a tough upbringing. His childhood was spent smuggling to make a living as he came from a very poor family. He was a kolbar.

During the Battle of Kobani, Herdem was profiled by an Iranian-Kurdish AFP photographer whose photos have featured widely in the international press. He gave interviews to a number of international media outlets describing how he had shot ISIL militants from 400 metres with a Russian-produced Dragunov rifle. He was featured in Jos de Putter's short film, Story of a Sniper, distributed by Journeyman Pictures.

He was also the commander of a unit, the Kobani Sniper Group.

Herdem was killed on 7 April 2015 after the liberation of the city centre. "If the snipers were kings in Kobanê, then Hardem was the Emperor", said one of Herdem's YPG colleagues in a tribute to him.

References

External links 
 Journeyman.tv – Story of a Sniper

2015 deaths
People killed in the Syrian civil war
Kurdish military personnel killed in action
Iranian Kurdish people
People's Protection Units
Year of birth missing